Karosa B 732 is an urban bus produced by bus manufacturer Karosa from the Czech Republic, in the years 1983 to 1997. It was succeeded by Karosa B 932 in 1997.

Construction features 

Karosa B 732 is a variant of the Karosa 700 series. The B 732 is derived from the Karosa B 731 city bus, and also unified with city bus model B 741 and with intercity bus C 734. The body is semi-self-supporting with frame and engine with manual gearbox in the rear part. The engine drives only the rear axle. The front axle is independent, rear axle is solid. All axles are mounted on Air suspension. On the right side are three doors (first are narrower than middle doors). Inside are used leatherette seats, plastic Vogelsitze or Fainsa seats. The driver's cab is separated from the rest of the vehicle by a glazed partition. In the middle, or in the rear part is room for a pram or wheelchair.

Production and operation 
In the year 1983 started serial production, which continued until 1997. These buses were operated mostly in Czech Republic and Slovakia.
Currently, number of Karosa B732 buses is decreasing, due to supply of new Low-floor buses.
Last Karosa B732 in Prague was retired on 19 April 2013.
Last Karosa B732 in Plzeň was retired in May 2014.
Last Karosa B732 in Brno was retired in August 2015.

Chollima-973 
A number of Karosa B732 in Pyongyang were converted to trolleybuses. At least 14 were built, but only 8 trolleybuses remain in service.

References

See also 

 List of buses

Buses manufactured by Karosa
Buses of the Czech Republic